The Peninsular Ranges (also called the Lower California province) are a group of mountain ranges that stretch  from Southern California to the southern tip of the Baja California peninsula; they are part of the North American Coast Ranges, which run along the Pacific Coast from Alaska to Mexico.

Geography

The Peninsular Ranges include the Santa Ana Mountains, Temescal and other mountains and ranges of the Perris Block, San Jacinto and Laguna ranges of southern California continuing from north to south with the Sierra de Juárez, Sierra de San Pedro Mártir, Sierra de San Borja, Sierra de San Francisco, Sierra de la Giganta, and Sierra de la Laguna in Baja California. Palomar Mountain, home to Palomar Observatory, is in the Peninsular Ranges in San Diego County, as are Viejas Mountain and the San Ysidro Mountains. The Peninsular ranges run predominantly north-south, unlike the Transverse Ranges to their north, which mostly run east-west.

Geology
Rocks in the ranges are dominated by Mesozoic granitic rocks, derived from the same massive batholith which forms the core of the Sierra Nevada Mountains in California.  They are part of a geologic province known as the Salinian Block which broke off the North American Plate as the San Andreas Fault and Gulf of California came into being.

Between this set of ranges and the Transverse Ranges is the complex Malibu Coast—Santa Monica—Hollywood fault, which exists as the border between these two mostly geologically unitary provinces.

Ecology and flora

Nearctic

Most of the Peninsular Ranges are in the Nearctic realm. Several terrestrial ecoregions cover portions of the Peninsular Ranges. On western-coast side of the northern portion of the ranges the California montane chaparral and woodlands sub-ecoregion of the California chaparral and woodlands ecoregion covers in southern California and northern Baja California. On western-coast side  of the southern portion of the ranges the Baja California Desert ecoregion covers in the southern portion of the Peninsular Ranges in Baja California and Baja California Sur. On eastern side of northern ranges, the Sonoran Desert ecoregion covers southeastern California and northeastern Baja California as far south as the town of Loreto, Baja California Sur. On the eastern side of the Laguna Mountains in San Diego County the Anza-Borrego Desert State Park is known for its springtime profusion of Colorado Desert (Sonoran) wildflowers. On eastern-Gulf of California side of the southern portion of the ranges the Gulf of California xeric scrub ecoregion covers the range in Baja California Sur.

The higher portions of the Peninsular Ranges, especially the west-facing slopes, are home to coniferous and mixed evergreen forests. Cleveland National Forest covers much of the higher Southern California Peninsular Ranges. The vegetation includes oak woodlands and forests of Jeffrey Pine (Pinus jeffreyi) and Coulter Pine (Pinus coulteri). The Sierra Juarez and San Pedro Martir pine-oak forests cover upper slopes of Sierra Juarez and San Pedro Martir ranges in Baja California. These isolated forests, predominantly Tamarack Pine (Pinus contorta subsp. murrayana), Sugar Pine (Pinus lambertiana), Parry Pinyon (Pinus quadrifolia), White Fir (Abies concolor), California Incense Cedar (Calocedrus decurrens), and junipers. Oak species include Coast Live Oak (Quercus agrifolia), Engelmann Oak (Quercus engelmannii), Canyon Live Oak (Quercus chrysolepis), and Baja Oak (Quercus peninsularis). These higher portions of the Peninsular Ranges harbor many rare and endemic species.

Neotropic
Southern Baja California Sur is part of the Neotropical realm.  The southern end of the Baja California Peninsula, including the Sierra de la Laguna Peninsular Range, was, like the rest of the peninsula, originally part of the Mexican mainland.  It was sheared off the mainland, becoming at one time an island, and evolved in relative isolation from the northern part of the peninsula and ranges. Its flora and fauna share many affinities with southern Mexico and Central America. It includes three distinct ecoregions, the Sierra de la Laguna dry forests, Sierra de la Laguna pine-oak forests, and San Lucan xeric scrub.

See also 
Peninsular Ranges index
Transverse Ranges
List of mountain ranges
Santa Maria Valley (San Diego County)

References

External links

 
Lists of mountain ranges
Geologic provinces of California
Mountain ranges of Baja California
Mountain ranges of Baja California Sur
Mountain ranges of Mexico
Mountain ranges of San Diego County, California
Mountain ranges of Southern California
Pacific Coast Ranges
Physiographic sections
Physiographic regions of Mexico
Physiographic regions of the United States